Events from the year 1776 in Denmark.

Incumbents
 Monarch – Christian VII
 Prime minister – Ove Høegh-Guldberg

Events

 15 January – The Danish Citizenship Act of 1776 reserves state offices for Danish, Norwegian and Holstein citizens.
 22 November  Frederik Bargum's revived Danish West India Company is liquidated.

Undated
 HDMS Indfødsretten is launched at the Royal Danish Dockyard in Copenhagen.
 Roskildevej is constructed across Frederiksberg Hill as a direct continuation of Vesterbrogade, with the effect that it passes Valby by to the detriment of the inn and other businesses.
 The King's Club is founded in Copenhagen.

Births
 6 January – Jonas Collin, philanthropist (died 1861) 
 29 May – Peter Erasmus Müller, bishop (died 1834)
 12 August  Henriette Danneskiold-Samsøe, landowner and businesswoman (died 1843)
 5 August  Urban Jürgensen, clockmaker (died 1830)
 14 August  Prince Christian of Hesse, prince (died 1814)
 27 August  Barthold Georg Niebuhr, Danish-German politician and banker (died 1831)
 8 September  Heinrich Meldahl, architect and industrialist (died 1840)
 22 October – Johan Caspar Mylius, military officer and landowner (died 1852)

Deaths
 17 April  Ludvig Ferdinand Rømer, businessman (born 1714)
 22 April  Johann Adolf Scheibe, composer (born 1708)
 30 April – Jens Krag-Juel-Vind, Supreme Court justice and landowner (died 1724) 
 4 June – Johann Gottfried Rosenberg architect (born 1709)
 8 July – Peder Als, painter (born 1725)
 15 September – Christian Horrebow, astronomer (born 1718)
 8 October  Margrethe Marie Thomasine Numsenm courtier (born 1705)

Publications
  Otto Friedrich Müller: Zoologiae Danicae prodromus

References

 
1770s in Denmark
Denmark
Years of the 18th century in Denmark